Jukka Rajala (born 13 April 1982 in Kuusankoski) is a Finnish former alpine skier who competed in the 2006 Winter Olympics.

External links
 sports-reference.com

1982 births
Living people
People from Kuusankoski
Finnish male alpine skiers
Olympic alpine skiers of Finland
Alpine skiers at the 2006 Winter Olympics
Sportspeople from Kymenlaakso
21st-century Finnish people